Jakob Herzog (1892 – 1931) was a Swiss Socialist. Originally a member of the Social Democratic Party of Switzerland, Herzog was expelled in 1918 for supporting the October Revolution.

Herzog was one of the founding members of the Swiss Communist Movement (Forderung) in 1918 and leader of the Communist Party of Switzerland (Altkommunisten) in the 1920s.

1892 births
1931 deaths
Swiss communists
Former Roman Catholics